Rukometni klub "Medveščak" is a handball club from Zagreb, Croatia.

They are one of the more famous branches of the Medveščak sports society, named after the Medveščak neighbourhood of Zagreb. They play in the sports and recreational centre Šalata. Through history club was also known as Prvomajska, Coning Medveščak, Medveščak Osiguranje Zagreb, Medveščak Infosistem, Agram Medveščak and Medveščak NFD.

Accomplishments 
National Championship of Yugoslavia: 4
 1953, 1954, 1964, 1966
National Cup of Yugoslavia: 7
 1970, 1978, 1981, 1986, 1987, 1989, 1990
 EHF Champions League 
 runner-up 1964/65
Limburgse Handbal Dagen: 1
 1993

Notable players

Famous coaches 

Vlado Stenzel (Štencl)
Josip Milković
Velimir Kljaić
Josip Šojat
Abas Arslanagić
Zlatko Lukić
Pero Janjić
Ante Kostelić
Josip Glavaš
Ivica Obrvan
Mirko Bašić
Vinko Tomljanović
Boris Dvoršek
Damir Štokić
Željko Zovko

External links 
Official page 

Croatian handball clubs
RK Medvescak
 
Handball clubs established in 1936
1936 establishments in Croatia